The Salem Church in Habo is a church building in Habo, Sweden belonging to the Evangelical Free Church in Sweden. The current church building was opened on 31 May 1991.

References

External links
official website 

20th-century churches in Sweden
Churches in Habo Municipality
Habo
Churches completed in 1991
1991 establishments in Sweden